The Sharpnose worm eel (Scolecenchelys acutirostris) is an eel in the family Ophichthidae (worm/snake eels). It was described by Max Carl Wilhelm Weber and Lieven Ferdinand de Beaufort, originally under the genus Muraenichthys. It is a marine, tropical eel which is known from Indonesia, in the western Pacific Ocean. It inhabits sandy areas near reefs.

References

Fish described in 1916
Scolecenchelys